Sex and Reason is a 1992 book about human sexuality by the economist and federal judge Richard Posner, in which the author attempts to explain sexual behavior in economic terms and discusses a range of controversial subjects related to sex, proposing reforms in American laws.

The book received mixed reviews. The work was described as ambitious and Posner was credited with providing a learned discussion of, and a valuable overview of scholarly literature about, sex. It was noted that Posner's discussion of homosexuality played a central role in his work. Some reviewers praised Posner's treatment of gay rights issues, including service in the American military by gay people, but others criticized his treatment of homosexuality. Posner was also criticized for his treatment of women's sexual behavior and preferences, feminism, female infanticide, welfare, contraception, rape, prostitution, pornography, and abortion, his use of sociobiology, the authorities he relied upon, and his approach to morality. Reviewers considered some of Posner's conclusions speculative. Posner subsequently reevaluated his view of gay rights, and abandoned the opposition to same-sex marriage he had expressed in the work.

Summary

Posner discusses human sexuality from a multidisciplinary perspective, aiming to summarize the principal findings of scientific literature on the subject and explain their relevance to law. He considers controversial topics such as the AIDS epidemic, abortion, the gay rights movement, the sexual revolution, surrogate motherhood, marital rape, date rape, sexual harassment, sexual abuse, and pornography. According to Posner, he decided to write about sex because of his "belated discovery that judges know next to nothing about the subject beyond their own personal experience", despite being responsible for the interpretation and application of laws regulating sex. He describes his reading of the philosopher Plato's 4th century BC dialogue the Symposium, which he describes as a "highly interesting and articulate" defense of homosexual love, as one of the events that inspired him to begin the research for his book. Posner writes that his "larger ambition is to present a theory of sexuality that both explains the principal regularities in the practice of sex and in its social, including legal, regulation and points the way toward reforms in that regulation—thus a theory at once positive (descriptive) and normative (ethical)." He refers to this approach to the study of sexual behavior and its social regulation as "the economic theory of sexuality", describing it as, "Functional, secular, instrumental" and "utilitarian".

Authors whose work on sex Posner discusses include Sigmund Freud, the founder of psychoanalysis, the biologist Alfred Kinsey, and the philosopher Michel Foucault. He writes that Kinsey was "picked by the university authorities to head up the newly created Institute for Sex Research" and that "when their limitations are understood and respected" the Kinsey Reports "are a vast mine of useful information, have been repeatedly corroborated by other studies, and appear to be generally accurate, at least for the sample interviewed, because of the extraordinary lengths to which the interviewers went to elicit truthful answers." According to Posner, sociobiology has "advanced striking hypotheses concerning aspects of human sexuality such as courting, the double standard, polygamy, and homosexual preference." He refers to the anthropologist Donald Symons's The Evolution of Human Sexuality (1979) as the "best single book on the sociobiology of sex".

Posner criticizes the philosopher Herbert Marcuse, maintaining that Marcuse's Eros and Civilization (1955) contains "political and economic absurdities" but also interesting observations about sex and art. He credits Marcuse with providing arguments that made his work a critique of conventional sexual morality superior to Bertrand Russell's Marriage and Morals (1929), but accuses Marcuse of wrongly believing that polymorphous perversity would help to create a utopia and that sex has the potential to be a politically subversive force. He considers Marcuse's argument that capitalism has the ability to neutralize the subversive potential of "forces such as sex and art" interesting, though clearly true only in the case of art. He argues that while Marcuse believed that American popular culture had trivialized sexual love, sex had not had a subversive effect in societies not dominated by American popular culture.

Publication history
Sex and Reason was first published in 1992 by Harvard University Press.

Reception

Mainstream media
Sex and Reason received a positive review from A. W. B. Simpson in The Times Literary Supplement, mixed reviews from the philosopher Martha Nussbaum in The New Republic, Marek Kohn in New Statesman and Society, the lawyer Tony Honoré in the London Review of Books, and the legal scholar Jedediah Purdy in The American Prospect, and negative reviews from Elizabeth Kristol in The American Spectator and the philosopher Roger Scruton in National Review. Other discussions include those from Don Herzog in The New York Times Book Review, M. Gordon in Choice, The Chronicle of Higher Education, and the legal scholar Patricia J. Williams in The Nation.

Simpson described the book as "highly readable" and wrote that it was "rich in its ingenuity and humane in its orientation" and "based on a genuine attempt to derive rational guidance for social policy from an immense literature". He credited Posner with being able to "pursue his analysis without using any weak buttressing arguments" and with resisting "the temptation to push the analysis too far" and with being "aware of the limits of economic analysis".

Nussbaum described the book as "an ambitious and complex undertaking". She found Posner's attempts to provide judges with relevant information about sexual topics and to advance a normative theory of sexual legislation more successful than his attempt to provide a comprehensive explanatory theory of sexual behavior. She questioned his attempts to analyse homosexuality and prostitution in ancient Greece, and argued that his attempts to combine historical with biological and economic analysis sometimes produced inconsistent conclusions. She described his claims that men are more sexually jealous than women and that women found men likely to protect and care for their children to be their ideal of a sexual partner as false, and noted that his thesis that whenever individuals think rationally they seek to maximize their satisfactions was controversial. She criticized him for failing to provide an account of human sexuality that encompassed both the intentionality of sexual desire and its expression as a drive aiming at satisfaction, and questioned whether his theory of human sexuality was "really the alternative to moral and religious theories of sexuality that he believes it to be." Though critical of his legal and moral theorizing, she credited him with such accomplishments as offering a "devastating criticism" of the arguments most often used to support the exclusions of homosexuals from the military.

Kohn credited Posner with providing a useful review of literature on sex and wrote that Sex and Reason would be valuable to researchers. However, he criticized him for considering "coercive sex, almost exclusively, as a method of acquiring sexual gratification" despite his familiarity with feminist literature, for ignoring the "role of rape in the subjugation of women", and for neglecting the irrational side of sexual behavior. Honoré described the book as "bold and ambitious", but while he believed that Posner's attempts to explain male and female sexual behavior through sociobiology had "some plausibility", its weakness was that "no one has so far identified the genes that predispose us to gene-preserving behaviour." Purdy considered Posner learned and intelligent. However, he criticized him for believing that scientific knowledge is the only kind of knowledge and maintaining that morality consists only of taboos and offers "no possibility of increased insight." Though he believed that his analysis of the factors influencing sexual behavior was partly correct, he believed that he failed to appreciate that people understand that their sexual behavior is related to their identity, values, and relations with others. He maintained that he "pays a great deal of attention to how we get what we want, but none at all to our deliberation over what we should want and pursue."

Kristol criticized Posner for his treatment of rape, describing it as strange. She argued that he incorrectly refused to consider "sympathy for the victim and moral disgust" as reasons for criminalizing rape. She also criticized his treatment of date rape, writing that it reflected a "peculiar view of women", and argued that he was inconsistent by ignoring moral revulsion in his discussion of rape but taking it into account as a relevant factor in his discussion of same-sex marriage. She was unpersuaded by his use of utilitarian arguments, especially in the case of abortion, disagreed with his negative assessment of Christian morality, and faulted him for not taking full account of the importance of children.

Scruton granted that Posner was a "clever and lucid writer", but nevertheless believed that his attempt to analyse human sexuality through rational choice theory was "about as unreasonable as a discussion of sex could be" and that he was not "a very acute observer of the human world." He expressed disagreement with his understanding of the term "sexual behavior", and wrote that he described sexual gratification in "repugnant terms" and that his language made "normal sexual desire" incomprehensible. He argued that there was an inconsistency between his attempt to analyse sexual behavior through rational choice theory and his reliance on sociobiology, since the latter involved no reference to "the individual's desire or of the rational choice needed to fulfill it" and therefore could not provide a foundation for an economic theory based on rational choice. He concluded that his arguments made "nonsense not only of sexual morality" but also of related legislation, arguing that they distorted understanding of issues such as rape.

Williams described Sex and Reason as a "curious book", and suggested that Posner was an "intelligent man blinded by the theories in which he wraps the purity of his assumptions". She criticized his treatment of rape.

Gay media
Sex and Reason was discussed by Robert Morris in Island Lifestyle Magazine. Morris included the book on a list of "must reads".

Scientific and academic journals
Sex and Reason received positive reviews from Diane M. Daane in the Journal of Sex Research, Ralph Sandler in Southern Economic Journal, and J. H. Bogart in Ethics. The book received mixed reviews in Review of Political Economy from Chidem Kurdas and Peter J. Boettke, and from Alexander Wohl in ABA Journal, the journalist Midge Decter in The Public Interest, the economist Robert M. Anderson in the Journal of Economic Literature, the feminist economist Nancy Folbre in Population and Development Review, Marcel Roele in Politics and the Life Sciences, Marie Reilly in the Archives of Sexual Behavior, and The Wilson Quarterly. It received negative reviews from Gillian K. Hadfield in Harvard Law Review, the philosopher Robert P. George in Columbia Law Review, Gertrude Ezorsky in Sex Roles, the sociologist John Gagnon in the American Journal of Sociology, and the feminist legal scholar Catharine MacKinnon in the Harvard Civil Rights-Civil Liberties Law Review.

Other reviews included those by the legal scholar William Eskridge in the Yale Law Journal, Nussbaum in University of Chicago Law Review, Jeffrey S. Calkins in Western State University Law Review, the law professor Martha Ertman in the Stanford Law Review, Carol Sanger in Southern California Law Review, Margaret Chon in The George Washington Law Review, Chris Hutton in the South Dakota Law Review, the legal scholar Jane Larson in Constitutional Commentary, Daniel W. Skubik in Federal Bar News & Journal, Robin West in the Georgetown Law Journal, Victor G. Rosenblum in The Annals of the American Academy of Political and Social Science, Martin Zelder in Michigan Law Review, and Francis C. F. Chang in Criminal Law Forum. Posner discussed the work in Connecticut Law Review and Yale Law Journal, and was interviewed about it in ABA Journal. The book was also discussed by Claire A. Hill in Law and Social Inquiry.

Daane considered the book a "thought-provoking new approach to sexuality" and credited Posner with providing "a very impressive review of the literature." She found his analysis of the role of religious beliefs in influencing sexual behavior interesting, and believed that it "could result in provocative research." She wrote that his "analysis of the policy questions surrounding homosexuality", particularly the exclusion of homosexuals from military service, was "comprehensive, informative, and timely." However, she found his discussion of "the regulation of sexuality", while informative, to be "at times controversial", for example where rape was concerned. She criticized him for arguing that many rapes, and the seduction of children, are victimless crimes because of the unlikelihood that the victims would complain about them, noting that had "never seen victimless crime defined as a crime in which the victim is unlikely to report", and his rejection of feminist views of rape, noting that "the vast majority of the literature on rape" defines rape as "a form of violence, control, hostility, and dominance." She also criticized him for employing conflicting approaches to the study of sexual behavior, such as sociobiology and social constructionism, which in her view led to theoretical inconsistency. She also found the book poorly written, and suggested that Posner might be trying to impress his readers with his vocabulary.

Sandler described the book as an "ambitious" and "very timely" work that "contains a vast muitidisciplinary literature on sex which Posner brilliantly summarizes and makes accessible to the reader." He considered it likely to be "very influential." He credited Posner with applying useful economic concepts to the study of sexual behavior, thereby synthesizing a diverse body of scholarly literature on the subject of sex and promoting a "more tolerant and rational set of policies toward sexuality". He believed that he made "a compelling intellectual case for a diminished government role" despite the absence of "empirical research" in his work, which he considered unsurprising. He noted that some of his views, such as that "homosexuals are likely to be more neurotic and homosexual relationships less stable", were "likely to be controversial", and criticized him for suggesting, with little evidence, that "sex laws cannot be explained as an attempt to deal with extemalities or promote efficiency they may be designed to redistribute wealth to some interest group." He also believed that he "sometimes demonstrates the inherent limitation of using utilitarian analysis on such issues as the control of pregnancy."

Bogart credited Posner with providing a useful summary of current knowledge about sexuality and showing that common beliefs such as that gay men and lesbians are "10 percent of the population" are incorrect. He praised his discussions of the role of urbanization in sexuality and social practices of ancient Greece. He believed that the bibliographic information in Sex and Reason was valuable and that the book was suitable as a textbook about sex. Though he noted that his focus was not primarily normative and suggested that he had an "impoverished view of morality and other normative theories", he still considered his discussions of normative issues, such as the ethics of the sale of reproductive services, interesting. He credited him with effectively criticized some aspects of legal restrictions on sex in the United States at the time he was writing. However, he criticized him for citing Freud in his discussion of sex, and believed that his arguments were sometimes "inconsistent or incomplete", arguing that he put forward incompatible definitions of rape in different parts of the book. He also believed that there was a tension between his ethical intuitions and his economic analysis of sex. He concluded by defending Sex and Reason against what he considered common misinterpretations that misunderstood the intention and purposes of the book.

Kurdas described the book as ambitious and useful. He endorsed Posner's policy suggestions, but argued that he failed to explain "the persistence of inefficient laws and practices", confused "function" and "efficiency" and used evidence selectively. He criticized his speculation about the causes of teenage pregnancy in the United States, his attempt to "calculate the cost of abortion to unborn foetuses", his argument that female infanticide is the efficient method of controlling population for societies that lacked any means of contraception, and his view that the sexual mores of a given society depend on the occupational status of women in that society. He questioned his view that his arguments could be made independently of biological assumptions, arguing that it was partly because of those assumptions that he focused mainly on sexual choices made by men and treated women's choices as mostly incidental men's choices. He criticized him for discussing male homosexuality at length while neglecting lesbianism. He argued that his view that some women have substituted the welfare state for individual men left open "the question of how women choose sexual partners, given the security provided by the welfare state". He believed that he wrongly considered "all social choices amenable to rational optimization", when in fact many factors produced "boundaries to rational choice."

Boettke argued that while the book might be the "boldest treatment" of sexual behavior from an economic point of view, Posner failed to address many of the most important issues about sexuality, such as "the meaning of sexual behaviour and policies." He criticized him for dismissing alternative theories of sexual behavior, such as psychoanalytic and feminist views, and for rejecting the critical theory of Marcuse. He also argued that because of his stance of "value neutrality", he could not deal adequately deal with his "critics on either the left or right", including feminist scholars, and that his discussion of the legal regulation of pornography failed to refute points made by MacKinnon. He considered his "privileging of the efficiency norm" unjustified, and believed that it forced him into "the rather absurd position of pushing for the unlimited applicability of the efficiency standard." He criticized him for failing to examine the rules governing sexual behavior by simply treating them as "constraints within which efficient action by individuals takes place", arguing that as a result his analysis of sex suffered from deficiencies similar to those of his legal theory and would not "persuade anyone who is not already convinced of the merits of Posernian analysis to legal and social questions." He also argued that "many of Posner's most intriguing contributions fail by his own standards of science".

Wohl described the book as "creative and provocative", but suggested that it strengthened the view that Posner was no longer a realistic candidate for justice of the Supreme Court. He considered his attempt to analyse sexual behavior in economic terms "challenging", crediting him with "offering several intriguing views of contemporary sexual and legal problems" and "an engaging examination of the history of sexual behavior and changing sexual norms and practices", but believed that it ultimately "fails as a comprehensive analysis." In his view, both his conclusions and his methods of reaching them would inevitably be disturbing, noting that "it is perverse to require proof that marital rape really does adversely affect the wife, as if this were subject to debate." He criticized him for "using charges of political correctness" to pre-empt challenges to his views, although he considered him correct to state his views in tentative terms. He believed liberals would agree with many of his conclusions despite disagreeing with his terminology and methodology, and that his work might help to make the legal profession familiar with scholarly literature on sexuality. However, he considered it unlikely that Sex and Reason would lead to increased support for the application of scientific principles to sex and the law, or attract people to the disciplines of law and economics.

Decter wrote that the book was ambitious and learned, but that it was also poorly organized. She considered its documentation impressive, but criticized Posner's reliance on authors such as Kinsey and Foucault, as well as John Gagnon and Phyllis and Eberhard Kronhausen. She believed that some of his conclusions, such as that the ratio of men to available women must affect courtship and marriage, were "long known and self-evident", that his historical evidence did not always support his claim that sexual customs can be understood as "rational responses to external circumstances." She also wrote that economic analysis did not help to explain the "general sexual condition that we Americans are in today", arguing that "economic principles cannot explain why at this moment, when women have become so vastly much freer and more casual with their sexual favors, there should be so much more, and so much more open, homosexuality than ever before." In her view, his arguments would have suggested that the frequency of homosexuality should have diminished. She also questioned how economic analysis could explain why "gay bars and hangouts continue to abound and prosper" despite AIDS, "the honor and tearful gratitude bestowed far and wide upon those who reveal to the world that they have contracted the disease", or why abortion was still common despite the availability of contraception. She mentioned pornography and prostitution as additional examples, noting that prostitution did not seem to have declined despite the existence of singles bars.

Anderson described the book as "ambitious". He credited Posner with providing an erudite review of the literature on sex and a compelling argument that a small number of factors explain cross-cultural variation in sexual behaviors and customs. He suggested that homosexuality plays a central role in Sex and Reason, and credited him with establishing that sexual orientation is unchosen, likely biologically determined, and unchangeable. However, he argued that he had made insufficient efforts to "obtain demographic data on sexual minorities, and lesbians in particular". He also predicted that some of his theoretical analysis would be controversial, especially those concerning abortion and infanticide, and that some of his conclusions about homosexuality were incorrect. He criticized him for implying that conventionally masculine men are necessarily heterosexual, for asserting that not only European countries, but also Latin American countries, the Philippines, and Japan are significantly more tolerant of homosexuality than the United States, for his treatment of rape, which he considered unclear and debatable in its conclusions about rapists' motives, and his treatment of the issue of whether prostitution should be legalized, which he found inconsistent. He criticized him for failing to "articulate a theory of the appropriate role for criminal penalties as opposed to other regulatory actions", which he believed would have helped him to reach unambiguous conclusions, the details of his economic analysis, his arguments against welfare programs, and his discussion of same-sex marriage.

Folbre praised Posner's discussions of "debates concerning erotic art, pornography, and law." She wrote that he improved on past economic approaches to sexual behavior with discussions of topics such as homosexuality. She credited him with making a "penetrating critique of state intervention in the private lives of citizens", including making a clear defense of "the legal rights of gays and lesbians". She noted that "the claim that a significant portion of the population has some innate predisposition toward homosexuality is central to his argument." However, she criticized him for his treatment of feminist theory, arguing that he neglected "the possibility that domestic violence ... and rape reflect a male desire to dominate, rather than a cheap means of obtaining sexual satisfaction" and missed the point that "men and women have collective identities and interests based on their gender." She also wrote that, "Even those who welcome his defense of sexual freedom will reject his laissez-faire approach to the family", that his rejection of religious morality left "little room for a moral concept of right and wrong", that he was unconcerned that the sale of reproductive services might produce exploitative results or that most states did not "effectively enforce mothers' and children's claims on the incomes of fathers absent from the home", and that his "social history of sexuality" was speculative and uneven in quality.

Roele credited Posner with demonstrating how a "morally neutral model of sexual behavior can serve as a basis for normative analysis", and wrote that Sex and Reason was likely to help the development of bioeconomics. However, he noted that his sociobiological theory of the evolution of different sex-limited "genetic propensities for sexual preferences" was largely based on the work of Symons. He also wrote that his view that masturbation, homosexuality, fetishism, and voyeurism enable males to satisfy their sexual desires in the absence of available female sex objects fails to explain how a genetic basis for deviant sexual preferences could contribute to inclusive fitness. He argued that, aside from masturbation, these sexual behaviors "are unnecessarily costly" and require too much of a male's time and resources. In his view any genetic basis for such deviant sexual preferences "would have been weeded out in the process of natural selection and replaced by a propensity to be asexual if women were unaccessible." He argued that he put forward incompatible explanations of deviant male sexual behavior, one in terms of "inclusive fitness benefits to the individual" and the other in terms of "fitness benefits to the group". He also criticized his treatment of female infanticide and argued that he neglected "biological insights" that could have benefited his reasoning about sexual behavior.

Reilly considered some of Posner's ideas, such as that women have a weaker sex drive than men, controversial, noting that there was uncertainty about the relative importance of biological factors and choice as influences on sexual behavior. She wrote that his arguments about genetic influences on human behavior, especially those concerning "the adaptive purpose of homosexuality and other non-procreative sexual conduct", had angered critics. In her view, his economic analysis of sexual behavior, although original, resembled science fiction and had provoked divided reactions from legal scholars. She considered the value of his theory to be "its capacity to explain diversity among and changes in sexual behavior, and guide the formation of rational social policy". She wrote that it had the potential to be a "means of understanding the social and legal implications of sexuality", for example by showing how "changes in the cost of sexual practices" could help to explain "observed changes in practices" and predict responses to hypothetical changes. She credited him with explaining the relevance of different forms of marriage to the frequency of extramartial sexual relations, and helping to explain "the social and economic relationship between the sexes", including "the historic inequality of women", and suggested ways of expanding opportunities for women. However, she believed that the difficulty of determining the "costs and benefits of sexual activity across a diverse society" limited the impact of his policy recommendations.

The Wilson Quarterly credited Posner with providing "a grand tour of the practices of other cultures and eras", but considered his arguments less than fully persuasive, criticizing his explanation of the "rationality of women wearing high heels". The reviewer concluded that, "Ironically, Posner may fail to convince his readers that eroticism involves so many rational, "economically" calculable acts, even while he provides a model of how a jurist can dispense with personal prejudice and reason dispassionately about sex."

Hadfield criticized Posner for explaining the sexual division of labor in terms of biological differences between men and women. She argued that his discussion of sexual behavior focused disproportionately on men and in particular on male homosexuality. Though sympathetic to his conclusions about the legal treatment of homosexuality, she believed that his "normative analysis" was hampered by the nature of his economic analysis and that while he was correct to emphasize "the interdependence of marriage, sexuality, and women's economic dependence on men", he had a faulty understanding of women's economic activity and history. She also criticized his use of sociobiology to support the claim that men have a stronger sex drive than women, arguing that it depended on debatable assumptions about reproductive strategy. She considered some of his claims unsurprising, writing that they achieved only his objective of "bringing a common language to the analysis of sexual practices", and argued that he failed to distinguish consistently between a model of sexual practices and a model of sexual morality, to offer an economic account of the origins of public sexual morality, to provide an account of the social organization of child care, or to carefully analyze issues of power and dominance between the sexes. She also criticized his treatment of contraception, abortion, rape, sexual harassment, and prostitution.

George complimented Posner's attempt to explain phenomena such as the varying frequency of rape in different societies, the relationship between women's income and sexual mores, and the connection between polygamy and clitoridectomy. However, he criticized his treatment of Catholic sexual ethics, arguing that he had an inadequate understanding of the subject and failed to appreciate the "power and significance" of its challenge to his economic approach to sex. He criticized his discussion of contraception in particular.

Ezorsky criticized Posner's approach to morality, especially his view about the significance of "irrational antipathy or revulsion toward sexual practices", arguing that in a society in which antipathy toward homosexual practices was widespread, his arguments implied that homosexuality would be immoral, even though it might not be immoral in a society in which there was no such antipathy. She argued that "public policy and personal morality should take strong notice, not only of feelings of antipathy in a society" but also of the rights of individuals, concluding that, "Persecuted minorities should not feel immoral just because the majority says so." 

Gagnon described the book as repetitive and speculative. He criticized Posner's discussion of sex laws and his review of previous theories of sexuality.  He described some of his claims, such as that Kinsey was appointed by Indiana University to head the Institute for Sex Research, as factual errors, and believed that his analysis of sex was influenced by ideology and that he was mistaken to hold that his belief that evidence supports the idea of an innate sex drive and biological determination of potential and desirable sexual acts, including gender preferences in sexual relations, was connected only incidentally to his economic theory. He questioned the quality of his economic analysis, believing that his theory did not go beyond the assertions that individuals have acquired preferences and that they respond to opportunities provided for sexual activities in a social marketplace. He argued that his analysis was not systematic, instead being "largely metaphorical" in nature and reliant on "post hoc speculation". He also criticized him for interpreting Plato's Symposium as being about homosexuality rather than "Eros and wisdom among men of equal social status in classical Greece", and for arguing that rape is solely motivated by sexual desire rather than the wish to subordinate women. He considered his economic explanations of specific forms of sexual behavior and his perspective on their regulation to be the most interesting part of Sex and Reason, endorsing his view that there should be less government regulation of sexual conduct.

MacKinnon criticized Posner's treatment of pornography and his view that homosexuality is biologically determined. She compared his views to those of the philosopher Friedrich Engels, arguing that both combined "largely unquestioned biologism with economic determinism". She also accused him of mischaracterzing the views of radical feminists and argued that he was wrong to believe in the existence of human nature and mistakenly ignored "the social determinants of sexuality" and "the social fact of male dominance". She maintained that because his approach to sexuality was sociobiological, he could not adequately explain sexual abuse, and that he gave insufficient attention to women.

Interviewed about his work in ABA Journal, Posner characterized his opposition to same-sex marriage in Sex and Reason as "reactionary", and noted that both his views and public opinion had changed drastically since 1992. In his 2015 reassessment of his book in Yale Law Journal, Posner described it as "pro-homosexual" for a work of its time. However, he criticized his discussion of same-sex marriage, writing that Eskridge had made valid criticisms of his arguments. According to Posner, he took no account of his own arguments about same-sex marriage in Sex and Reason when deciding the Baskin v. Bogan case, which invalidated prohibitions of same-sex marriage in Indiana and Wisconsin.

Hill credited Posner with providing useful legal and economic descriptions of some sexual phenomena, and with applying economic reasoning "in interesting and creative ways to a broad array of current and historical sexual practices and regulations." However, she argued that some of his claims were insufficiently supported and that he did a poor job of applying law and economics to "the personal sphere". She believed he had given skeptics of his approach "some substance-based and methodological reasons" for dismissing his work. She argued that his intuitions and assumptions were less sound than he believed and that he did not realize the full extent to which he was relying on them. Though she considered his claim that "deviant sexuality" is much more common among men than among women likely to be correct, she nevertheless criticized him for citing only a single article to support it. She criticized his claim that women have weaker sexual drives than men, and as well as some of his other claims about differences between male and female sexuality, suggesting that he was biased. She questioned why he was willing to consider the possible benefits of clitoridectomy, but not those of a potential "male analogue" to the practice. She criticized his treatment of rape, noting that he depicted it "principally as a sexual outlet" and rapists as "normal", but nevertheless granted that the evidence might support his views. Though critical of some of his specific claims, and his relative neglect of lesbianism, she still credited him with making numerous helpful points about homosexuality.

References

Bibliography
Books

 

Journals

  
  
  
  
  
  
  
  
  
  
  
  
  
  
  
 
  
  
  
  
 
  
  
  
  
  
 
  
  
  
  
  
  
 
  
  
  
  
  
  
  
  
  
  
  
  

1992 non-fiction books
American non-fiction books
Books about sociobiology
Books by Richard Posner
Economics books
English-language books
Harvard University Press books
Non-fiction books about sexuality